Tunje may refer to:

 Tunjë
 Bertil Tunje
 the Arabic name for Russian Bank, a card game